Liberty Wharf is a shopping centre in St Helier, Jersey, which opened in November 2010. Much of the site is a former abattoir which was restored and converted for use as a shopping centre.

References

External links

Liberty Wharf Shopping Centre

Buildings and structures in Saint Helier
Shopping centres in Jersey
2010 establishments in Jersey
Shopping malls established in 2010